Mudge Farmhouse is a historic home located at Roslyn Harbor in Nassau County, New York.  It was moved to its present location about 1920. It dates to the 18th century and is built of oak timbers.  It features the original front Dutch door entry.  Alterations and additions occurred when the house was moved.  They are believed to have been designed by John Russell Pope, brother-in-law of the owner at the time, Robert Patchin.

It was added to the National Register of Historic Places in 1999.

References

Roslyn Harbor, New York
Houses on the National Register of Historic Places in New York (state)
Colonial Revival architecture in New York (state)
Houses in Nassau County, New York
National Register of Historic Places in Nassau County, New York